Quixote's Cove is an independent bookstore located in the town of Jawalakhel, in the Lalitpur District of Nepal. It serves as both a bookshop and a reading library, specializing in English-language literature. It promotes English writing by Nepali authors and has done book tours with Nepali writers including Manjushree Thapa, Sushma Joshi, Samrat Upadhyay, Rabi Thapa and Indian author Namita Gokhale.

Quixote's Cove specializes in fiction, business and philosophy books. It also functions as an events coordinator for literary and art events. It organizes QC Awards, an annual inter-school literary contest; Tavern Tales, a monthly literary event; and book clubs, and creative writing groups.

In 2009 Quixote organized an art installation exhibition with the title "Rhythm of Solitude" which focussed on the displacement of identity that has occurred during the urbanization in Kathmandu.

In 2016 the bookstore hosted the Retelling Histories workshop "as part of Nepal Picture Library education program".

References

External links
Quixote's Cove website
"Article on Quixote's Cove in REPUBLICA, April 2009"
QC Awards 2010 in Kathmandu Post

Bookstores of Nepal
Independent bookstores
Nepalese literature
Lalitpur District, Nepal